The Tarbell Cassette Interface is an expansion card for use with the Altair 8800 early personal computer, or other systems using the Altair's S-100 bus. It was designed by Don Tarbell and sold by Tarbell Electronics as early as 1976. At the time, it was considered to be fast, reliable, and popular. While supporting the 1975 Kansas City (Byte/Lancaster) standard, it also introduced a much faster Tarbell standard which became a de facto standard for compact cassette data storage.

Tarbell also sold other products, including TARBELL CASSETTE BASIC in 1978 and a Shugart Associates-compatible dual disk drive subsystem. The latter includes a Tarbell floppy disk interface, said to plug into any S-100 bus computer, introduced in 1979.

References

External links 
The Tarbell Cassette Interface Manual
"The board that launched the company and made Tarbell a household word in the world of the S-100 bus" s100computers.com
Tarbell S-100 boards and docs

Computer storage devices
Home computer peripherals
Tape-based computer storage
Early microcomputers